Ephialtias consueta is a moth of the  family Notodontidae. It is found in the lower Amazon in Brazil.

External links
Species page at Tree of Life project

Notodontidae of South America
Moths described in 1854